Steven J. C. Stanley (born July 11, 1958), is a Jamaican audio engineer, record producer and keyboardist  who has worked in the reggae, dub and rock music genres since 1975, most notably with Talking Heads, Tom Tom Club and Black Uhuru.

Stanley began as an in-house apprentice sound engineer at Aquarius Recording Studio in Halfway Tree, Kingston, Jamaica, September 1975. An integral part of the Compass Point All Stars, he was considered a member of the 1980s new wave group Tom Tom Club, co-producing their debut studio album Tom Tom Club (1981). He is credited as co-writer of "Genius of Love", one of the most sampled songs in hip hop music, having been re-interpreted by Grandmaster Flash and the Furious Five in the 1982 song "It's Nasty (Genius of Love)", and sampled by Dr. Jeckyll & Mr. Hyde, the X-Ecutioners, and on Mariah Carey's No. 1 hit "Fantasy" (1995) which earned Stanley a 1997 ASCAP Pop Award as a songwriter.

Stanley worked on the Grammy Award-winning studio albums, Anthem (1984) by Black Uhuru that he co-produced with Sly and Robbie, and Dutty Rock (2002) by Sean Paul, mixing the song "I’m Still in Love with You". Outside the reggae genre, Stanley has also worked with Grace Jones, the Blockheads's Chaz Jankel, Lizzy Mercier Descloux and the B-52's, receiving a Gold Album for Wild Planet (1981). He lives in Kingston, Jamaica and works at his studio there, Steven Stanley Recording Studio.

Discography
Never Ending by Beres Hammond (2018), VP Records - Mixing Engineer

References

External links
 
 
 

Jamaican audio engineers
Jamaican record producers
Tom Tom Club members
Living people
1958 births